Timeryovo is a rural locality (a village) in Lavrovskoye Rural Settlement, Sudogodsky District, Vladimir Oblast, Russia. The population was 15 as of 2010.

Geography 
Timeryovo is located 15 km north-west from Lavrovo, 21 km northwest of Sudogda (the district's administrative centre) by road. Natalyinka is the nearest rural locality.

References 

Rural localities in Sudogodsky District